Lightbody is a surname. Notable people with the surname include:

Alex Lightbody (born 1966), Irish lawn bowler and British champion
Gary Lightbody (born 1976), Northern Irish musician and songwriter
Hannah Greg (née Lightbody, 1766–1834), English mill-owner's wife
Ian MacDonald Lightbody (1921–2015), Scottish-born Hong Kong civil servant and government official
Jim Lightbody (1882–1953), American middle-distance runner
Mary Lightbody (born 1952), American educator and politician
Robert Lightbody (1802–1874), English amateur geologist
Simon Lightbody (born 1987), Australian cricket umpire
Stuart Lightbody (born 1992), Irish badminton player

English-language surnames